The 1994–95 Israeli Hockey League season was the fourth season of Israel's hockey league. Five teams participated in the league, and HC Bat Yam won the championship.

Regular season

Playoffs

Semifinals 
 HC Bat Yam - HC Metulla 13:5
 Jerusalem Capitals - HC Haifa 7:5

Final 
 HC Bat Yam - Jerusalem Capitals 11:3

External links 
 Season on hockeyarchives.info

Isr
Israeli League (ice hockey) seasons
Seasons